The 1999–2000 Hamburger SV season was the 112th season in the club's history. During the 1999–2000 season, they competed in the Bundesliga, in which they finished 3rd alongside the DFB-Pokal where they reached the third round and the UEFA Intertoto Cup, where they were finalists, losing to Montpellier on penalties. The season covers the period from 1 July 1999 to 30 June 2000.

Season summary
Hamburg rose to third place in the final table - their highest finish since finishing as runners-up in 1987.

First team squad
Squad at end of season

Left club during season

Competitions

Bundesliga

League table

References

Notes

Hamburger SV seasons
Hamburger SV